Derrylough is a townland of 222 acres in County Down, Northern Ireland. It is situated in the civil parish of Annaclone and the historic barony of Iveagh Upper, Upper Half. It is the most northerly townland in the parish of Annaclone.

References

Townlands of County Down
Civil parish of Annaclone